The seventeenth cycle of America's Next Top Model (subtitled as America's Next Top Model: All Stars and stylized as America's Next Top Model ALL ★ STARS) premiered on September 14, 2011 on The CW. It featured fourteen returning models from previous cycles.

The judging panel, unchanged since Cycle 14, once again consisted of Tyra Banks, Nigel Barker and André Leon Talley. The first judging was conducted in front of a live audience. The international destination for this cycle was the Greek island of Crete. The show’s first visit to Southeast Europe. 

The promotional song for this cycle was "You Make Me Feel..." by Cobra Starship featuring Sabi. This was the final cycle filmed and broadcast in standard definition and the final cycle for Andre Leon Talley as a judge.

The winner of the competition was 30-year-old Lisa D'Amato from Los Angeles, California, who originally placed sixth on Cycle 5 making her the oldest winner at the age of 30. Allison Harvard, who originally placed second on cycle 12 losing to Teyona Anderson, placed as the runner-up for the second time. Angelea Preston, who placed an equal third / fourth place with Alexandra Underwood on Cycle 14, and was disqualified from the competition in the final episode of the All Stars Cycle, said that she had originally won the competition but was stripped of her title after producers learned that she had once worked as an escort.

Casting

This season has been subtitled "All-Stars," featuring fourteen returning non-winning contestants representing twelve of the series' sixteen cycles for a second chance to win the title. Cycles 3, 6, 7 and 8 are all not represented. Cycles 1, 2, 4, 9, 10, 12, 13, 14, 15 and 16 were all represented by one contestant each and Cycles 5 and 11 were each represented by two contestants. 

Cycle 14 contestant Angelea Preston competed for the third time on America's Next Top Model in Cycle 17 as she was initially introduced as a semi-finalist on Cycle 12 best known for her fight with Sandra Nyanchoka who finished ninth after Celia Ammerman survived the bottom two in week five. Fourth placers Bianca Golden of Cycle 9 and Dominique Reighard of Cycle 10 participated in a competition hosted by Tyra Banks for the third time as they had both appeared on Modelville which aired within The Tyra Banks Show after their original appearances on America's Next Top Model.

The following former America's Next Top Model contestants were asked to be on Cycle 17, but they all declined or did not make the final cut.

Prizes
The prizes for this cycle were: A fashion spread in Vogue Italia, a cover and a spread in Beauty in Vogue, a blog on Vogue.it, and a 100,000 contract with CoverGirl cosmetics

In addition in these regular prizes, the new prizes were: A fashion campaign in Express, a guest correspondent placement for Extra, as revealed in episode 7, the chance to be the face of an ANTM-perfume to be launched and sold nationally.

The contract with IMG Models (present in the last 2 cycles) has been removed.

Contestants
(ages stated are at start of contest)

Episodes

Summaries

Call-out order

 The contestant was immune from elimination
 The contestant was part of a non-elimination bottom two
 The contestant was eliminated
 The contestant was originally eliminated but was brought back
 The contestant originally won but was disqualified
 The contestant won the competition

Bottom two

 The contestant was eliminated after her first time in the bottom two
 The contestant was eliminated after her second time in the bottom two
 The contestant was eliminated after her third time in the bottom two
 The contestant was eliminated in the final judging and placed as the runner-up

Average  call-out order
Final three is not included.

Photo shoot guide

 Episode 1 photo shoot:  All-Star personality
 Episode 2 photo shoot: Pink's Hot Dogs
 Episode 3 photo shoot: Modeling on stilts in pairs
 Episode 4 photo shoot: Express campaign with male models
 Episode 5 photo shoot: Michael Jackson tribute
 Episode 6 photo shoot: Catfights in a bar with Coco Rocha
 Episode 7 photo shoot: Reality stars on a motorbike
 Episode 8 music video: Pot Ledom viral videos
 Episode 9 photo shoot: Bench body underwear on a salad bowl
 Episode 10 photo shoot: Ancient Olympic athletes
 Episode 12 motion editorial: Tyra Banks' Modelland with Tyson Beckford
 Episode 13 photo shoot and commercial: CoverGirl Intense Shadow Blast print ad and Commercial, and Beauty in Vogue spread

Angelea's disqualification

Following the finale, reports began to speculate regarding the disqualification of Angelea Preston. Due to the bizarre circumstances surrounding the event, including the re-shooting of the final panel/winner reveal, many people began to speculate that Preston had been originally named the winner prior to her disqualification. Popular theories that circulated on social media during the months following the finale included speculation that Angelea had broken contract by revealing her win on social media, that she was pregnant, or dealing with substance abuse issues.

In January 2013, Angelea confirmed the reports by announcing that she had indeed won the competition prior to being stripped of the title, though she did not specify why. Tyra Banks did not comment on the situation.

In September 2014, Angelea revealed that the reason she was stripped of the title was because she had been working as an escort prior to participating in America's Next Top Model. She said the producers had been made aware of this before the filming of cycle 17, but decided to disqualify her only after she had already won the title. She is now filing a lawsuit against the producers, the network, and the studios due to breach of contract for $3,000,000 in damages. Other allegations in the lawsuit included that the show violated fair labor practices by forcing her and other contestants to work 16-hour days, sometimes without a meal break, keeping the contestants in isolation for five to six hours at a time, without food or water. Additionally, she alleged that she wasn't paid a legal hourly wage for her work, nor overtime wages. She also claimed that show staff failed to provide her with proper medical attention when she suffered a panic attack during filming.

Cast members

Additional cast
 J. Alexander – runway coach
 Jay Manuel – photo shoot director

Notes

References

External links
 

2011 American television seasons
America's Next Top Model
Television shows filmed in California
Television shows filmed in Greece